Knutson Dam was a dam located along the Upper Mississippi River within the Chippewa National Forest and was originally built in 1890s as a logging dam. In 1928 it was rebuilt by the U.S. Army Corps of Engineers and management of the dam was given to the U.S. Forest Service.

The dam was removed and replaced with rock arch rapids in 2015.

External links
Knutson Dam Campground - USFS

References

Dams in Minnesota
Dams on the Mississippi River